Coquillettidia is a mosquito genus erected by entomologist Harrison Gray Dyar Jr. in 1904 based primarily on unique features of its "peculiar" male genitalia.  The specific epithet honors Dyar's colleague Daniel William Coquillett.

The genus comprises three subgenera, Austromansonia, Coquillettidia, and Rhynochotaenia, and 57 species, of which Coquillettidia perturbans is perhaps the best known.

Bionomics

Not all species have been well documented, but females of some are known to feed primarily on birds but will also bite cattle.  The females bite primarily at night, and are most active during the early part of the night. They occasionally attack humans during daylight hours in shady places when their habitat is entered.

Adult females lay their eggs on the surface of water in areas of emergent vegetation to which hatchling larvae attach themselves with a modified siphon, on the roots or submerged stems, and where they remain throughout development; pupae also attach themselves the plants by means of a modified respiratory trumpet, and remain there until the adult is ready to emerge.

Species in the subgenus Coquillettidia are primarily Afrotropical, but some are found in the Oriental and Australasian Regions, one occurs in North America and two occur in the Palearctic region. Austromansonia occurs only in New Zealand, while species of subgenus Rhynchotaenia are confined to the Neotropical Region.

Medical importance

Coquillettidia perturbans is considered a vector of eastern equine encephalitis; other species are secondary or suspected vectors of Brugia malayi the cause of lymphatic filariasis, and Rift Valley fever.

See also
Mosquito control

References

External links
Species in subgenus Austromansonia at the Walter Reed Biosystematics Unit
Species in subgenus Coquillettidia at the Walter Reed Biosystematics Unit
Species in subgenus Rhynchotaenia at the Walter Reed Biosystematics Unit

 
Mosquito genera
Taxa named by Harrison Gray Dyar Jr.